Tim Lee may refer to:
 Tim Lee (musician) (born 1970), English musician, record producer, and DJ
 Tim Lee (comedian), American stand-up comedian
 Tim Lee, American musician, part of The Windbreakers

See also
 Tim Berners-Lee (born 1955), British engineer and computer scientist